Pensus is a genus of beetles in the family Silvanidae. A member of the subfamily Silvaninae, Pensus contains two species, Pensus gilae (Casey) and Pensus guatemalenus (Sharp), with a combined range of the southwestern United States to Guatemala.

References

Silvanidae genera